The Intertribal Buffalo Council (ITBC), also known as the Intertribal Bison Cooperative, is a collection of 82 federally recognized tribes from 20 different states whose mission is to restore buffalo to Indian Country in order to preserve the historical, cultural, traditional, and spiritual relationships for future Native American generations.

Surplus bison from places such as Badlands National Park in South Dakota, Yellowstone National Park in Wyoming, and Grand Canyon National Park in Arizona are relocated to member tribes. Collectively, the ITBC manages over 20,000 bison on over 1,000,000 acres of tribal lands.

History 

In February 1991, in the Black Hills of South Dakota, the Native American Fish and Wildlife Society hosted nineteen tribes to discuss ways to reestablish healthy buffalo populations on tribal lands. They decided to form an organization to assist tribes with buffalo programs. That June, Congress appropriated funding for tribal buffalo programs. Tribal representatives met in December to discuss how these appropriations would be spent.

In April 1992 tribal representatives gathered in Albuquerque, NM and officially formed the InterTribal Bison Cooperative (ITBC). Officers were elected and began developing their criteria for membership, articles of incorporation, and by-laws. In September 1992, ITBC was incorporated in the state of Colorado and that summer ITBC was headquartered in Rapid City, South Dakota.

In 2010 it was reorganized from a nonprofit to a federally chartered Indian Organization under Section 17 of the Indian Reorganization Act as the InterTribal Buffalo Council.

On September 25, 2014, in Browning, MT, eight tribes, including four ITBC member tribes, from the US and Canada signed the Buffalo Treaty committing to returning the buffalo to their lands and into their lives.

On May 9, 2016, US Congress signed into law the National Bison Legacy Act, establishing the American bison as the national mammal. The ITBC was part of a coalition that helped pass the law.

Currently the ITBC is working to pass the Indian Buffalo Management Act, which would establish a permanent program within the Department of the Interior to develop and promote tribal ownership and management of buffalo and buffalo habitat on Indian lands.

Since its formation, the ITBC has grown from 19 member tribes to 82 and continues to grow.

Members 

As of December 2021, its members included:
 Alutiiq Tribe of Old Harbor
 Blackfeet Nation
 Cherokee Nation
 Cheyenne and Arapaho Tribes
 Cheyenne River Sioux Tribe
 Chippewa Cree Tribe of the Rocky Boy Reservation
 Confederated Salish & Kootenai Tribes of the Flathead Nation
 Confederated Tribes of Umatilla
 Crow Creek Sioux Tribe
 Crow Tribe of Indians
 Eastern Shoshone Tribe
 Flandreau Santee Sioux Tribe
 Forest County Potawatomi
 Fort Belknap Indian Community
 Fort Peck Assiniboine & Sioux Tribes
 Ho-Chunk Nation
 Iowa Tribe of Oklahoma
 Jicarilla Apache Nation
 Kalispel Tribe of Indians
 Leech Lake Band of Ojibwe
 Lower Brule Sioux Tribe
 Mesa Grande Band of Mission Indians
 Meskwaki Nation (Sac & Fox Tribe of MS in IA)
 MHA Nation (Three Affiliated Tribes)
 Modoc Nation
 Nambé O-Ween-Gé
 Native Village of Ruby
 Northern Arapaho Tribe
 Northern Cheyenne Tribe
 Oglala Sioux Tribe
 Ohkay Owingeh/San Juan Pueblo
 Omaha Tribe of Nebraska
 Oneida Nation
 Osage Nation
 Picuris Pueblo
 Pit River Tribe
 Ponca Tribe of Nebraska
 Prairie Band Potawatomi Nation
 Prairie Island Community
 Pueblo de Cochiti
 Pueblo of Pojaque
 Pueblo of Sandia
 Pueblo of Tesuque
 Quapaw Tribe of Oklahoma
 Red Lake Nation Band of Chippewa
 Rosebud Sioux Tribe
 Round Valley Indian Tribes
 Sac & Fox Nation of Missouri in Kansas and Nebraska
 Salt River Pima-Maricopa Indian Community
 Santee Sioux Tribe of Nebraska
 Seminole Nation of Oklahoma
 Seneca-Cayuga Nation
 Shakopee Mdewakanton Sioux Community
 Shoshone Bannock Tribes
 Sisseton Wahpeton Oyate
 Skull Valley of Goshutes
 Southern Ute Tribe
 Spirit Lake Nation
 Standing Rock Sioux Tribe
 Stevens Village
 Stillaguamish Tribe of Indians
 Taos Pueblo
 Tonkawa Tribe
 Turtle Mountain Band of Chippewa
 Ute Indian Tribe
 White Earth Nation
 Winnebago Tribe of Nebraska
 Yakama Nation
 Yankton Sioux Tribe

References 

Native American organizations
Nature reserves in the United States